The Madagascar women's national handball team is the national team of Madagascar. It is governed by the Fédération Malgache de Handball and takes part in international handball competitions.

African Championship record
2021 – 11th place
2022 – 13th place

References

External links
IHF profile

Women's national handball teams
Handball